Saint-Palais-sur-Mer (literally Saint-Palais on Sea) is a commune in the Charente-Maritime department in southwestern France.

Population

Gallery

See also
Communes of the Charente-Maritime department

References

Communes of Charente-Maritime
Seaside resorts in France
Charente-Maritime communes articles needing translation from French Wikipedia